Agricola is a census-designated place and unincorporated community in George County, Mississippi. Per the 2020 Census, the population was 346.

Agricola is home to Agricola Elementary School (AES). Agricola was a station on the Pascagoula Northern Railroad. 

A post office operated under the name Agricola from 1909 to 1964.

Demographics

2020 census

Note: the US Census treats Hispanic/Latino as an ethnic category. This table excludes Latinos from the racial categories and assigns them to a separate category. Hispanics/Latinos can be of any race.

References 

Unincorporated communities in George County, Mississippi
Gulfport–Biloxi metropolitan area
Unincorporated communities in Mississippi
Census-designated places in George County, Mississippi